Edward Laboran (born 23 June 1942) is a former Papua New Guinean high jumper.

Laboran won the high jump event at the inaugural Papua New Guinea National Championships, held in Lae on 6 October 1962, with a leap of 1.90 m. He went on to win this event for the next three years.

This set a new national record which stood for five years.

Twelve months later at the inaugural South Pacific Games in Suva, Fiji, Edward easily won gold in the high jump. This established an inaugural games record that stood until the 1971 Games in Tahiti.

In the 2011 Pacific Games in Nouméa, Laboran was honoured by participating in a medal ceremony for the Athletics competition.

In December 2011, Laboran alongside Sir John Kaputin, became the inaugural inductees into the Papua New Guinea Olympic Committee Sporting Hall of Fame.

References

1942 births
Living people
Male high jumpers
Papua New Guinean high jumpers
Commonwealth Games competitors for Papua New Guinea
Athletes (track and field) at the 1962 British Empire and Commonwealth Games
Place of birth missing (living people)
Papua New Guinean male athletes